Eyüp Sabri Hayırlıoğlu, born Ayyub Sabri (1 January 1887 – 8 October 1960) was a Turkish politician and lawyer.

Notes

References

Turkish politicians

1887 births
1960 deaths